The Caretaker Cabinet of Vassiliki Thanou-Christophilou was formed following the resignation of the Syriza-ANEL coalition government on 20 August 2015, and the failure of opposition parties to form their own government. The cabinet was headed by Thanou-Christophilou, the President of the Court of Cassation, who was sworn in as Prime Minister on 27 August 2015, and the rest of the cabinet were sworn in the next day on 28 August. The cabinet remained in office until the completion of the legislative election on 20 September 2015.

Background 
On 20 August 2015, Prime Minister Alexis Tsipras, who was leading a Syriza-ANEL coalition government, resigned following a rebellion by party members on a key vote related to the third bailout package. Tsipras said that he needed a stronger mandate in order to implement the bailout package, and so called for a snap legislative election to take place in September.

According to the Greek constitution, the President of Greece could not just call an election, but had to consult all the major parties in turn to see if they could form their own government, described by The Guardian at the time as "a near impossibility given the current makeup of the parliament." On 27 August, the President, Prokopis Pavlopoulos, informed the party leaders that there was no chance of a coalition government being formed by the existing parliament.

That evening, Vassiliki Thanou-Christophilou was sworn in as the caretaker Prime Minister of Greece. On 28 August, the rest of the caretaker cabinet were sworn in at the Presidential Mansion. Later that day, Pavlopoulos signed a degree for the snap election, setting the date at 20 September. Also, the caretaker cabinet had their first meeting where they agreed to work towards an "impeccable" election.

Appointments 
George Chouliarakis, an academic economist who had been part of the Greek negotiating team during the talks surrounding the third bailout package, was appointed as Minister of Finance. Petros Molyviatis, a "veteran diplomat", was appointed as Minister of Foreign Affairs, a role he had held in 2012 and from 2004 to 2006. Alkistis Protopsalti, a singer, was appointed as the Alternate Minister of Tourism.

Composition
The cabinet was composed of ten full ministers, nine alternate ministers, one deputy minister and two Ministers of State, for a total of 22 members. This would become 23 members if the Government Spokesman, Rodolfos Moronis, was included. 20 members of the cabinet (including Moronis) were male; 3 were female.

Only two members of the First Cabinet of Alexis Tsipras remained in the same roles, Panagiotis Nikoloudis as Minister of State for Combatting Corruption and Tryfon Alexiadis as Alternate Minister of Finance. Dimitris Papangelopoulos had formerly served in Tsipras's cabinet as a Deputy Minister for Justice, but served as the Minister of Justice, Transparency and Human Rights in the Caretaker Cabinet.

Cabinet list

Prime Minister

Cabinet

Ministers of State

Bold denotes full ministers attending the weekly cabinet council.  a Deputy ministers are not members of the cabinet but may attend cabinet meetings. 
References:

References

Cabinets of Greece
Cabinets established in 2015
Cabinets disestablished in 2015
2015 in Greek politics
2015 establishments in Greece
2015 disestablishments in Greece
Greek government-debt crisis
Caretaker governments